The following list is a complete collection of results for the Scotland national rugby league team.

1990s

2000s

2010s

2020s

See also 
 Scotland A national rugby league team
 List of Scotland national rugby league team players

External links 
 Scotland – Results at rugbyleagueproject

References

 "Rugby League Bravehearts" by Gavin Willacy
 Scotland RL
 Rugby League International Scores
 Rugby League World

Rugby league in Scotland
Rugby league-related lists
Scotland national rugby league team